Rambutaneia is a monotypic moth genus in the family Pyralidae. Its only species, Rambutaneia udjana, is found in Indonesia. Both the genus and the family were first described by Rolf-Ulrich Roesler and Peter Victor Küppers in 1979.

References

Monotypic moth genera
Pyralidae genera